Akçaören can refer to:

 Akçaören, Ilgaz
 Akçaören, Kazan
 Akçaören, Kemer
 Akçaören, Yığılca